Isenburg-Wied was the name of a state of the Holy Roman Empire, based around Neuwied in modern Rhineland-Palatinate, Germany. It was renamed from Isenburg-Braunsberg in 1388, and was superseded by Wied in 1462.

Counts of Isenburg-Wied

Counties of the Holy Roman Empire
House of Isenburg
States and territories established in 1210